Los Médicos Voladores provide free medical and dental clinics to Mexicans, Latin Americans and the migrant populations of the Southwestern United States.

References

External links
 

Health charities in the United States
Medical and health organizations based in California